Giliðtrítitindur is a mountain located in the island of Vágar (Faroe Islands), at an altitude of 643 metres.

See also 
List of mountains of the Faroe Islands

Mountains of the Faroe Islands